The Reload is a publication about gun politics in the United States. Founded by Stephen Gutowski in 2021, the subscription-based website is intended as a response to what Gutowski characterizes as misinformation about firearms in the mainstream media. Gutowski is the sole editor and journalist for the self-published publication, which has been described as pro-Second Amendment.

Background 
Prior to founding The Reload, Stephen Gutowski worked as a beat reporter on the topic of guns at the conservative Washington Free Beacon for almost seven years. He is a certified firearms instructor. Gutowski decided to leave the Free Beacon after observing the amount of profit other commentators were making by moving to the subscription-based platform Substack.

Establishment 
The Reload was founded by Stephen Gutowski in 2021. A subscription-based website, it is intended as a response to what Gutowski characterizes as misinformation about firearms and related issues in the mainstream media. Gutowski built the website himself.

Structure

Editorial structure 
Gutowski is the editor, publisher, and journalist for The Reload.

Pricing 
, a subscription to the publication cost $10 per month.

Stances 
National Public Radio has described The Reload as "a pro-Second Amendment gun issue publication".

References 

Publications established in 2021
Gun politics in the United States
Subscription services